Al Dia may refer to:
 Al Día (Costa Rica), a Costa Rican newspaper
 Al Día (Guatemala), a Guatemalan newspaper
 Al Día (Dallas), a Spanish-language U.S. newspaper in the Dallas-Fort Worth region
 Al Día (Philadelphia), a Spanish-language U.S. newspaper in the Philadelphia region

See also 
 El Día (disambiguation)
 Dia (disambiguation)